Laha is a town of Nehe City in western Heilongjiang province, Northeast China. There are 5 communities and 2 villages under the town's administration.

References
2009年讷河市行政区划. Retrieved 2011-05-05

Township-level divisions of Heilongjiang